An Ziwen (25 September 1909 – 25 June 1980), born as An Zhihan (安之瀚), was a Chinese politician and member of the Central Committee of the Chinese Communist Party. He served as minister of the CCP Central Committee Organization Department, the Central People's Government Minister of Personnel, deputy secretary of the Central Discipline Inspection Commission, the Standing Committee of the CPPCC National Committee, among other roles. He authored the book "Revolutionary successors training is a strategic task of the party".

Biography 
An was born in September 1909 in Zizhou County, Shaanxi province. In 1925, he joined the Chinese Communist Youth League, and in 1927 was inducted into the Chinese Communist Party. He participated in the Second Sino-Japanese War and the Chinese Civil War. In 1949, An was appointed as head of the Personnel Ministry, and was elected as a CPPCC Standing Committee member. He served as vice minister of the Central Organization Department, and was appointed as the Central Commission for Discipline Inspection and deputy secretary. In 1956, at the Eighth CCP National Congress,  he was elected as head of the CCP Central Organization Department. 

In his 1964 article Fostering Revolutionary Successors as a Strategic Task for the Party, An wrote about the threat posed by the peaceful evolution theory propounded by John Foster Dulles. In particular, An focused on Dulles's statement at an October 28, 1958 press conference that peaceful evolution was "absolutely possible in a few hundred years, but perhaps just a matter of a few decades."

In 1966, at the beginning of the Cultural Revolution, he was persecuted as one of the 61 Renegades and expelled from his posts. In 1978 under Deng Xiaoping, he was rehabilitated and appointed as vice president of the Central Party School, the latter co-opted to the Central Committee. On 25 June 1980, he died in Beijing.

Family
An Ziwen married Liu Jingxiong, come from Shanxi province. They have three children. Specific information are as follows:

Wife
Liu Jingxiong (刘竞雄), daughter of Chinese politician and official Liu Shaobai

Children
 An Li (安黎), former vice mayor of Shanmen, eldest daughter of An Ziwen
 An Min (安民)， Former Vice Minister of China's Ministry of Commerce 
 An Guo (安国)

Brothers 
An Zhiwen (安志文), third brother of An ziwen and alternate delegate of 12th National Congress of the Chinese Communist Party

Nephew 
An Jiaoju (安鲛驹), general of Chinese People's Armed Police Force (PAP)

See also 
 61 Renegades (:zh:六十一人叛徒集团案)

References

1909 births
1980 deaths
Politicians from Yulin, Shaanxi
Chinese people of World War II
Chinese Communist Party politicians from Shaanxi
Victims of the Cultural Revolution
People's Republic of China politicians from Shaanxi
61 Renegades
Members of the 11th Central Committee of the Chinese Communist Party